Văn Chấn is a rural district of Yên Bái province, in the Northeast region of Vietnam. As of 2020, the district had a population of 116,804. The district covers an area of 1,129.90 km2. The district capital lies at Sơn Thịnh.

Administrative divisions
Văn Chấn is divided into 24 commune-level sub-divisions, including 3 townships (Nông trường Liên Sơn, Nông trường Trần Phú, Sơn Thịnh) and 21 rural communes (An Lương, Bình Thuận, Cát Thịnh, Chấn Thịnh, Đại Lịch, Đồng Khê, Gia Hội, Minh An, Nậm Búng, Nậm Lành, Nậm Mười, Nghĩa Sơn, Nghĩa Tâm, Sơn Lương, Sùng Đô, Suối Bu, Suối Giàng, Suối Quyền, Tân Thịnh, Thượng Bằng La, Tú Lệ).

References

Districts of Yên Bái province
Yên Bái province